Kipa or KIPA may refer to:

 Kipa (supermarket), a Turkish supermarket chain
 alternative spelling of kippah, a type of Jewish hat

People with the name 
 Ming Kipa (born 1988), Nepalese Sherpa girl who climbed Mount Everest
 Rangi Kipa (born 1966), New Zealand sculptor, carver and artist
 Kipa Babu, Indian Politician

Acronyms and Radio stations 
 KIPA (AM), a radio station (1060 AM) licensed to serve Hilo, Hawaii, United States
 KHBC (FM), a radio station (92.7 FM) licensed to serve Hilo, Hawaii, which held the call sign KIPA in 2009
 KHNU, a radio station (620 AM) licensed to serve Hilo, Hawaii, which held the call sign KIPA from 1947 to July 2008
 Korea Institute of Public Administration, a government-sponsored research institute in South Korea